Pass It On Down may refer to:

 Pass It On Down (Alabama album), 1990
 "Pass It On Down" (song), a song recorded by the country music group Alabama
 Pass It On Down (The Elders album), 2005